Petplan is a London-based pet insurance company. Pet Plan Limited is a subsidiary of  Allianz Insurance plc, part of the Allianz Global Group. Petplan is the largest pet insurance provider in the UK.

History
Petplan was launched in 1976 by Patsy Bloom and David Simpson. When it was launched, Petplan products covered domestic cats and dogs, with cover extending to rabbits.

Services and subsidiaries
Petplan insurance covers unexpected illnesses, accident and injuries for dogs, cats and rabbits. Policies provide coverage for hereditary, congenital and chronic conditions – including cancer, diagnostic testing, prescription medications, non-routine dental treatment, MRI, CAT scan and ultrasound imaging as standard.

Petplan’s Covered For Life policies re-fresh the veterinary fee benefit each year providing ongoing cover for the life of the pet as long as the policy is renewed annually with no break in cover 

Like other pet insurance companies, Petplan does not cover pre-existing conditions. Pre-existing conditions are defined as those medical conditions that first occurred or showed clinical signs or symptoms before the effective date of the policy, or that occurred or showed clinical signs or symptoms within the first fourteen days of the policy.

Petplan Equine
Founded in 1988, Petplan Equine is an offshoot of Petplan UK that provides horse and rider insurance throughout the UK.

Philanthropy
Petplan works with more than 1,200 charities throughout the UK. Partners include: Battersea Dogs & Cats Home, Blue Cross, Cats Protection, Dogs Trust, and the Scottish SPCA. In 1994, the Petplan Charitable Trust was formed to raise funds to promote the health and welfare of animals. In 2013, Petplan launched the annual Animal Charity Awards in conjunction with the Association of Dog and Cat Homes  which recognise animal charities and non-profit animal organisations across the UK who help to rescue and rehome animals.

References

External links
 Official site
 Petplan Vet
  Petplan Equine
  Petplan Trust
 Petplan Spain
 Petplan USA
 Petplan Canada
 Petplan Netherlands
 Petplan Germany
 Petplan Australia
 Petplan New Zealand

Allianz
Pets in the United Kingdom
British companies established in 1976
Financial services companies established in 1976
Insurance companies of the United Kingdom
Pet insurance
1976 establishments in England